"Quicksand" is the thirteenth single by Dutch singer Caro Emerald. 
It was released as a Digital download on April 24, 2015, in the Netherlands as the planned lead single from her third studio album. It was added to the 'B' list on BBC Radio Two. The song eventually didn't end up on any album.

Track listing

Charts

Weekly charts

Year-end charts

References

2015 songs
Caro Emerald songs
Songs written by David Schreurs
Songs written by Vincent DeGiorgio